The 2021 Southern Illinois 100 presented by Lucas Oil was the 17th stock car race of the 2021 ARCA Menards Series season, and the 35th iteration of the event. The race was held on Sunday, September 5, in Du Quoin, Illinois at the DuQuoin State Fairgrounds Racetrack, a  permanent clay oval-shaped track at the DuQuoin State Fair. The race took 104 laps to complete due to an overtime finish. At race's end, Landen Lewis of Rette Jones Racing would dominate the race, leading every lap en route to his first career ARCA Menards Series win. To fill out the podium, Ty Gibbs of Joe Gibbs Racing and Ken Schrader of Fast Track Racing would finish second and third respectively.

Background 
The DuQuoin State Fair was founded in 1923 by local businessman William R. "W.R." Hayes, who owned the fair and ran it. (It did not become run by the state of Illinois as a true "state fair" until the 1980s; it is now officially called the Illinois State Fair in DuQuoin, as opposed to the longtime one at state capital Springfield.) At the start Hayes had a half-mile harness-racing track on his 30-acre site, with wooden grandstands that seated 3000. In 1939 Hayes started buying adjoining stripmined land to develop its potential as parkland, replanting it and turning the strip pits into family-friendly ponds and lakes. He eventually expanded his little fairgrounds into 1200 acres.

The DuQuoin "Magic Mile" racetrack was constructed on reclaimed stripmine land in 1946 by W.R. Hayes. The track's first national championship race was held in September 1948. In the second race on October 10, popular AAA National driving champion Ted Horn was killed in the fourth turn when a spindle on his championship car broke. The national championship race for the USAC Silver Crown dirt cars is held in his honor.

Entry list

Practice 
The only 45-minute practice session was held on Sunday, September 5, at 4:15 PM CST.

Qualifying 
Qualifying would take place on Sunday, September 5, at 6:00 PM CST. Each driver would have one lap to set a time.

No drivers would fail to qualify. Jesse Love and Kelly Kovski did not make a qualifying lap, and had to start the race from the rear.

Race results

References 

2021 ARCA Menards Series
Southern Illinois 100
Southern Illinois 100